We Ain't Even Supposed 2 B Here is the debut studio album by Sensato del Patio.

Track listing

References

2013 debut albums
Spanish-language albums